Manwolam is a Buddhist temple of the Jogye Order in Seoul, South Korea. It is located at San 29-1 Dobong 1-dong,  in the Dobong-gu area of the city.

History
The temple is said to be founded by the Silla monk Uisang. In 1940, a new building has been constructed. The location is popular meditation location for buddhist monks.

See also
List of Buddhist temples in Seoul

References

External links
koreatemple.net

Buddhist temples in Seoul
Buildings and structures in Dobong District
Buddhist temples of the Jogye Order